The Fjäderholmarna (English: Feather Islands) are a group of small islands in the Stockholm archipelago close to downtown Stockholm, Sweden. The Fjäderholmarna consist of the four named islands of Stora Fjäderholmen, Ängsholmen, Libertas and Rövarns holme, together with a number of smaller islets. The Fjäderholmarna are located within the municipality of Lidingö, and are administered as part of the Royal National City Park. 

Stora Fjäderholmen can be reached by regular boat services from various locations in central Stockholm, with a voyage duration of about 20 minutes. The island is home to a number of craft workshops and stores, as well as several restaurants and cafes.

References

External links

Fjäderholmarna official web site

Islands of the Stockholm archipelago
Islands of Lidingö Municipality